The year 1621 in music involved some significant events.

Events
January 6 – Andrea Salvadori's poem, "Donne musiche parlano dall'Inferno" (Women musicians speak from Hell) is performed at the court's Epiphany celebrations in 1621.
August 3 – The masque The Gypsies Metamorphosed, written by Ben Jonson and designed by Inigo Jones, is performed for the first time; it is repeated twice more in August and September. The masque features the music of Nicholas Lanier.
The San Bartolomeo Theater, the first opera house, opens in Naples.

Publications
 Gregor Aichinger – Corolla eucharistica, ex variis flosculis et gemmulis pretiosis musicarum sacrarum (A Little Eucharistic Crown, woven from various little flowers and precious little gems of sacred music) (Augsburg: Johann Praetorius)
 Gregorio Allegri – Motets for two, three, four, five, and six voices (Rome: Luca Antonio Soldi)
 Giovanni Francesco Anerio –  (Rome: Giovanni Battista Robletti), a collection of arias, villanellas, and madrigals
 William Brade –  for five instruments (Berlin: Martin Guth), a collection of dance music
 Antonio Cifra
Second book of masses (Rome: Luca Antonio Soldi)
Second book  for eight voices (Rome: Luca Antonio Soldi)
Fifth book of madrigals for five voices (Rome: Luca Antonio Soldi)
 Christoph Demantius
Psalm 127 for eight voices (Freiberg: Georg Hoffmann), an epithalamium for the wedding of Georg von Walwitz and Catharina-Sophia von Löwen on June 26
,  for eight voices (Freiberg: Georg Hoffmann), an epithalamium for the wedding of David Fritsche and Sabina Lincken on September 18
 (Freiberg: Georg Hoffmann), an epithalamium for the wedding of Caspar Engels and Maria Schneider
 for six voices (Freiberg: Georg Hoffmann), an epithalamium for the wedding of Joachim Ludwig von Penzelin and Maria Schmieden
 Giacomo Finetti –  for two, three, and four voices with organ bass (Antwerp: Pierre Phalèse)
 Melchior Franck
 for four, five, and six voices or instruments (Coburg: Andreas Forckel for Salomon Gruner), a collection of secular partsongs
 for eight voices (Coburg: Andreas Forckel), a funeral motet
 Sigismondo d'India
 for four voices and basso continuo (Venice: Alessandro Vincento), a collection of balletti
 Duarte Lobo – Book of Masses for four, five, six, and eight voices (Antwerp: Plantin)
 Isaac Posch –  for four and five voices (Nuremberg: Abraham Wagenmann for Isaac Posch), a collection of dance music
 Thomas Ravenscroft – The Whole Booke of Psalmes

Opera 
Pietro Pace – L'Ilarcosmo

Births
March 28 – Heinrich Schwemmer, German music teacher and composer (died 1696)
probable
Albertus Bryne, English composer and organist (died 1668)
Matthew Locke, English composer and theorist (died 1677)

Deaths
February 15 – Michael Praetorius, composer and theorist (born 1571)
March 28 – Ottavio Rinuccini, librettist (born 1562)
June 21 – Kryštof Harant, nobleman, traveller, writer and composer (born 1564) (executed)
August 23 – Antonio Il Verso, composer (born 1565)
October 16 – Jan Pieterszoon Sweelinck, composer, organist and teacher (born 1562)
November 30 – Francesco Rasi, Italian singer and composer (born 1574)
date unknown
Ippolito Fiorini, lutenist and composer (born 1549)
Edmund Hooper, organist (born c.1553)
Francesco Soriano, composer (born c.1548)

References

 
Music
17th century in music
Music by year